The 1983–84 NC State Wolfpack men's basketball team represented North Carolina State University during the 1983–84 men's college basketball season. It was Jim Valvano's 4th season as head coach.

Coming off the 1983 National Championship, the 1983–84 season was a rollercoaster. The Wolfpack had four streaks of 5+ games (2 winning streaks, 2 losing streaks), including a 7-game losing skid to end the season. NC State finished with a record of 19–14 (4–10 ACC).

Roster

Schedule and results

|-
!colspan=9 style=| Non-Conference Regular Season

|-
!colspan=9 style=| ACC Regular Season

|-
!colspan=12 style=| ACC Tournament

|-
!colspan=12 style=| National Invitation Tournament

Rankings

References

NC State Wolfpack men's basketball seasons
Nc State
NC State Wolfpack men's basketball
NC State Wolfpack men's basketball
Nc State